Dorothy "Dot" Miles (19 August 1931 – 30 January 1993, née Squire) was a Welsh poet and activist in the deaf community. Throughout her life, she composed her poems in English, British Sign Language, and American Sign Language. Her work laid the foundations for modern sign language poetry in the United States and the United Kingdom. She is regarded as the pioneer of BSL poetry and her work influenced many contemporary Deaf poets.

From 1957 to 1977, Miles lived as an expatriate in the United States. In 1967, she joined the National Theatre of the Deaf. She then returned to the United Kingdom, where she became a key member of the British Deaf Community. By the early 1990s, Miles was experiencing manic depression. In 1993, Miles committed suicide by falling from a second-floor window.

Biography 

Miles (née Squire) was born 19 August 1931 in Holywell, Flintshire, North Wales, daughter of James and Amy Squire (née Brick). She was the youngest of five surviving children. In 1939 she contracted cerebrospinal meningitis, which left her deaf.  She  was educated at the Royal School for the Deaf and the Mary Hare School. In 1957, at the age of 25, she went to the United States to take up a place at Gallaudet College, sponsored in part by the British Deaf and Dumb Association. During her time at the college she became the first member of a junior class to be a member of the Gallaudet Phi Alpha Pi honour society, was in the 1961 edition of "Who's Who in American Colleges and Universities", edited the student magazines and won prizes for both her prose writing and poetry and for acting. Some of her work was published in The Silent Muse, an anthology of selected writings by deaf authors of the last 100 years. She also wrote the Bison's song.

She married a fellow student, Robert Thomas Miles, in September 1958. They separated in 1959. She graduated in 1961 receiving a BA with distinction. She worked in the United States as a teacher and counsellor for deaf adults. In 1967, she joined the newly founded National Theatre of the Deaf and began to create sign language poetry that deaf people – as well as hearing people – could appreciate.

In 1975, Miles left the NTD to work with the campus service for the deaf at California State University, Northridge. She returned to live in England in the autumn of 1977, after twenty years in the United States. Miles was soon involved in the National Union of the Deaf's Open Door (BBC TV) pioneering television programme (in which she performed her poem Language for the Eye) and was involved in discussions that led to the See Hear television series. She took work with the British Deaf Association, working on various projects. She compiled the first teaching manual for BSL tutors and became involved in setting up the Council for the Advancement of Communication with Deaf People (CACDP). She also worked on the BDA dictionary.

For a while she worked as a self-employed writer, lecturer and performer, becoming involved in promotion of sign language teaching and training of tutors and deaf theatre. She was involved in setting up and then teaching on the British Sign Language Tutor Training Course – the first university course for training deaf people to become BSL tutors. She also wrote the best-selling BBC book BSL – A beginner's guide, which was published to complement the television series.

Suicide 

By the early 1990s, Miles was a key figure in the British Deaf Community. She died on 30 January 1993 when she fell from the window of her second-floor flat. The inquest at St. Pancras Coroner's Court concluded that she killed herself while experiencing manic depression.

Legacy 
Miles is regarded as a key figure in the literary heritage of sign language and the deaf community. It has been suggested that she is the source of most of the sign language poetry performed today. She was passionate about deaf issues, culture and sign language and longed to bridge the gap between deaf and hearing people. The Dorothy Miles Cultural Centre was established by a group of both Deaf and hearing friends in her memory.  She features as one of a series of portraits of notable deaf artists painted by Nancy Rourke.

The Dorothy Miles Cultural Centre was a well-loved organisation based in Surrey, spreading British Sign Language and raising Deaf Awareness in the community. This mantle was taken up by Dot Sign Language, which took over when the Cultural Centre closed. Dot Sign Language continues to teach qualifying British Sign Language courses in Woking and Guildford, as well as Deaf Awareness workplace training. They spend many hours working in the community, in Schools, Scout troops, Brownies and all other youth groups, so that all youngsters can see BSL in action, in real life and interact with Deaf people. They have such a high pass rate and such outstandingly successful teaching methods that they were shortlisted for award and recognition in January 2017 by the examining body 'Signature'.

See also

 Deaf culture
 Sign Language

References

Bibliography
 British Sign Language: A Beginner's Guide Produced to accompany the BBC Television series, British Sign Language. It has a foreword by HRH The Princess of Wales.
 Bright Memory   Dorothy Miles (British Deaf History Society, Doncaster, 27 July 1998) 
 Gestures: Poetry in Sign Language  Dorothy Miles (Paperback) (1 December 1976)
Joyce Media

Further reading

External links
https://web.archive.org/web/20041108191259/http://www.sign-lang.uni-hamburg.de/Intersign/Workshop2/Spence.html
http://www.bbc.co.uk/programmes/p0151k17

1931 births
1993 suicides
20th-century Welsh educators
20th-century Welsh poets
20th-century Welsh women writers
20th-century women educators
People from Holywell, Flintshire
Welsh women dramatists and playwrights
Anglo-Welsh poets
Anglo-Welsh women poets
Gallaudet University people
Gallaudet University alumni
Deaf poets
20th-century Welsh dramatists and playwrights
Welsh deaf people
BSL users
Welsh expatriates in the United States
People with bipolar disorder
Female suicides
Suicides by jumping in the United Kingdom
1993 deaths
Educators of the deaf